The Astra A-60 is a double-action, single-action, semi-automatic pistol at one time produced in Spain by Astra-Unceta y Cia SA. The design is similar to the Walther PP and features a slide-lock release lever.

See also
 Service Pistol
 Walther PP

External links
 Gunboards Forums, CETME Rifles And More, The Spanish Pistol Board: Astra A-60

Semi-automatic pistols of Spain
.32 ACP semi-automatic pistols
.380 ACP semi-automatic pistols
Firearms articles needing attention